Heikki Asunta (25 June 1904 – 28 June 1959) was a Finnish writer. His work was part of the literature event in the art competition at the 1948 Summer Olympics.

References

1904 births
1959 deaths
20th-century Finnish writers
Olympic competitors in art competitions
People from Ruovesi